The West Lebanon-Pike Township Public Library in West Lebanon, Indiana, United States, is a Carnegie library serving southwestern Warren County.  Its original  brick-and-limestone building was constructed in 1916 using a $7,500 gift from Andrew Carnegie.  A $610,000 renovation in 2006 added  of floor space, plus better access for handicapped patrons, more shelf space and a multi-purpose children's activity room.  The library's collection contains approximately 12,000 books.

External links
West Lebanon-Pike Township Public Library

References

Education in Warren County, Indiana
Public libraries in Indiana
Library buildings completed in 1916
Carnegie libraries in Indiana
Buildings and structures in Warren County, Indiana